1972 Language violence in Sindh occurred starting on 7 July 1972 when the Sindh Assembly passed The Sindhi Teaching, Promotion and Use of Sindhi Language Bill, 1972 which established Sindhi language as the sole official language of the province resulting in language violence in Sindh.

The proclamation of Sindhi as the official language of Sindh caused the Daily Jang, an Urdu language newspaper in Karachi, to publish a full-page story on their front page surrounded by a banner with the statement "Urdu ka janaza hai zara dhoom se nikle" (It is the funeral of Urdu thus should be a flaunting one) by Rais Amrohvi.

Aftermath 
In 1972, when the PPP-led Sindh government declared Sindhi as the province’s official language, groups of Mohajir students formed the Muttahida Tulaba Mahaz Karachi (MTMK). They asked car owners to change their number plates to Urdu and also attacked English signboards. Riots broke out between the police and the MTMK in Karachi and between Mohajir and Sindhi youth elsewhere in Sindh.

See also
 1972 Sindhi Language Bill

References

External links
 Language Bill creates violence
 When People Came to Blows Over Language: The Sindh Language
 Zulfikar Ali Bhutto's speech at Dadu(Sindh) on language riots

 
Politics of Sindh
Riots and civil disorder in Pakistan
1972 Language violence in Sindh
1972 Language violence in Sindh
Political riots
Race riots in Pakistan
Sindhi language
July 1972 events in Asia